Witch's Castle may refer to:

 Stone House (Portland, Oregon), a derelict structure, formerly a restroom, in Portland, Oregon's Forest Park along Forest Park's Wildwood Trail  
 The Three Witches, a South Korean television series